The United States Navy formed the Weapon System Explosives Safety Review Board (WSESRB) in 1968 as a result of the tragic fire on the USS Forrestal (CV-59).  The subsequent investigation recommended an independent review process be established.  The report highlighted the need to ensure explosives safety requirements are met for all munitions introduced to the Fleet.

As a result, the WSESRB was established.   WSESRB participate in numerous weapons system safety-related meetings, technical reviews, and working groups.

The US Air Force and US Army have parallel boards to the Navy's WSESRB: the AF Nonnuclear Munitions Safety Board (NNMSB) and the Army Weapon Systems Safety Review Board (AWSSRB)

Areas reviewed by weapon boards include
Safety and suitability for use in the system's predicted logistic and operational environments
Hazard classification
Insensitive munitions
Final (type) qualification of energetics
Lithium battery certification
Human systems integration

References

DODI 5000.69. DoD Joint Services Weapon and Laser System Safety Review Processes, Nov 2011.

United States Navy organization
Maritime safety organizations